The 1920–21 National Challenge Cup was the annual open cup held by the United States Football Association now known as the Lamar Hunt U.S. Open Cup.

History
On September 25, 1920, the National Challenge Cup held a drawing for the first round of the 1921 National Challenge Cup.  The drawing paired eighty-five entrants, down from 99 the previous year being due to the fact the entrance fee had been raised from $5 to $10.  The cup a single elimination format consisting of six rounds and a single game final.  The entrants were dividing into an eastern and a western division which led to a final pitting St. Louis Scullin Steel F.C. from the west and Brooklyn Robins Dry Dock from the east.

First round

Eastern Division

Northern Massachusetts District
Byes: Maple Leaf F.C.; Gray & Davis F.C.

Southern New England District
Byes: Young Thornton F.C.; Potter & Johnson F.C.; Colonial F.C.; Greystone F.C.; Fairlawn Rovers

Connecticut District
Byes: Stamford F.C.; Ansonia F.C.; Columbia Gramophone Co.

Southern New York District
Byes: Clan MacDuff F.C.; Brooklyn F.C.; Robins Dry Dock F.C.

New Jersey District
Byes: Cedar Cliff F.C.

Eastern Pennsylvania District

Western Division

Michigan District
Byes: I.F.L. F.C.; One and All F.C.; Walkerville F.C.; Magyar A.A.F.C.; Caledonia F.C.; Roses F.C.; Ulster F.C.

Ohio District
Byes: Cleveland Greyhounds F.C.; White Motor Co. F.C.; Goodyear F.C.

Northwestern New York District
Byes: Oneida Community Co. F.C.; McNaughton Rangers F.C.; Rochester City Moose F.C.; Rochester Celtic F.C.; Camera Works F.C.; Kodak Park F.C.

Western Pennsylvania District
Bye: Madison F.C.

Missouri District
Byes: Ben Miller F.C.; St. Louis Screw F.C.; Scullin Steel F.C.; Innisfail F.C.

Wisconsin District
Bye: Simco F.C.

Illinois District
Byes: Thistles F.C.; Bricklayers F.C.; Harvey F.C.; Swedish American A.A.; Pullman F.C.; Rangers A.C.; Norwegian American A.A.

Bracket
Home teams listed on top of bracket

(*): replay after tied match
w/o: walkover/forfeit victory awarded

Final

References

Sources
USOpenCup.com

U.S. Open Cup
Nat